Polygrammodes flavidalis, the ironweed root moth, is a moth in the family Crambidae. It is found in North America, where it has been recorded from Alabama, Florida, Georgia, Illinois, Indiana, Iowa, Kansas, Kentucky, Maryland, Mississippi, Missouri, New Jersey, North Carolina, Ohio, Oklahoma, Ontario, Pennsylvania, South Carolina, Tennessee, Texas, Virginia, West Virginia and Wisconsin.

References

Moths described in 1854
Spilomelinae
Moths of North America